Hamidids or Hamed Dynasty (Modern Turkish: Hamidoğulları or Hamidoğulları Beyliği) also known as the Beylik of Hamid, was one of the 14th century Anatolian beyliks that emerged as a consequence of the decline of the Sultanate of Rum and ruled in the regions around Eğirdir and Isparta in southwestern Anatolia.

The Beylik was founded by Dündar Bey (also called Felek al-Din Bey), whose father Ilyas and grandfather Hamid had been frontier rulers under the Seljuks. Felek al- Din's brother Yunus Bey founded the Beylik of Teke centered in Antalya and Korkuteli, neighboring the Hamidid dynasty to the south. During the reign of Ottoman Sultan Murad I, the rulers of Hamit were persuaded to sell Akşehir and Beyşehir.

Their territory became the Ottoman Sanjak of Hamid, roughly corresponding to the present-day Isparta Province.

See also
List of Sunni Muslim dynasties

References

Anatolian beyliks
Hamid
Hamid
States and territories established in 1300
Sunni dynasties